Profronde van Stiphout, also known as Bavaria Profronde Stiphout due to sponsorship reasons is an elite men's and women's professional road bicycle racing event held annually in Stiphout, Netherlands. The first edition was in 1980 and since 2001 the event also includes a women's race.

Honours

References

External links
 

Women's road bicycle races
Recurring sporting events established in 1980
1980 establishments in the Netherlands
Men's road bicycle races
Cycling in North Brabant
Sport in Helmond